Osterwald is a community and part of the Joint Community (Samtgemeinde) of Neuenhaus in the district of Grafschaft Bentheim in Lower Saxony. The community consists of the centres of Osterwald, Alte Piccardie and Hohenkörben (Veldhausen parish).

In Osterwald are found two brooks: the Soermannsbecke and the Böltbecke, which later empty into the Lee

Neighbouring communities

Osterwald’s neighbours are Veldhausen, Neuenhaus, Grasdorf, Georgsdorf, Esche, Hohenkörben and Bimolten.

History
The name Osterwald first crops up in 14th-century documents.

Politics
The mayor is Gerda Brookmann.

Economy
Osterwald’s economic mainstay is agriculture, and its next most important source of livelihood is the petroleum industry. Moreover, many smaller businesses are to be found, such as carpenter’s shops, a driving school and a shoe shop. Once, the petroleum industry was the community’s greatest economic factor. Also built in this time was the swimming pool, whose ceiling fell in; since that time, it has not been used.

Sport
Besides a football field used by BCO n.e.V.(Bolz Club Osterwald), there is also a sport hall, where volleyball, handball, basketball and football are played.

Population
Some of the people among those locally born, mostly older people, still speak Low German.

Culture
In Osterwald there are a petroleum museum and a farming museum. At the village community house, theatre performances or children’s musicals share space with weddings and other celebrations.

Furthermore, Osterwald is also a favourite place for people to come and play the regional game known as Kloatscheeten which involves teams rolling a small wooden disk with a leaden core along roadways.

References

External links
Joint Community’s webpage

County of Bentheim (district)